My Bollywood Bride is a 2006 English and Indian film, released in 2007 theatrically and was released as "My Faraway Bride", on DVD (Vivendi/Universal) in August 2008 and also premiered on Showtime and Starz in 2008. Written by Richard Martini and Kashmera Shah, story and produced by Brad Listermann, it stars Jason Lewis and Kashmera Shah and is directed by Rajeev Virani. Despite its setting in India and the story taking place in front of one of India's major film industries, Bollywood, the film does not feature the same amount or type of sing-and-dance-numbers Indian Cinema is famous for. Its primary language is English with some Hindi.

Plot
Alex (Jason Lewis), living in Venice Beach, is a struggling writer. One day, he meets Reena (Kashmera Shah) at the beach. They spend time together and Alex starts to fall in love with her. However, some days later, Reena disappears at LAX. The only thing Alex knows about her is that she's from Thakur Village, Mumbai, India - so he follows her there. In India, he discovers, with the help of his new driver Priyad (Ash Chandler) that Reena is the greatest film star of Bollywood and engaged to Shekar, an influential Bollywood producer. Alex stays with Bobby K. (Sanjay Suri), a friend of Reena and a big Bollywood actor himself - while Alex is struggling with his own romance, Bobby starts to fall for his choreographer, Alisha (Neha Dubey), an old friend from his past he very much disappointed by simply forgetting about her when he became famous. Reena, hesitant to break off an engagement arranged by her parents, feels that she owes Shekhar her entire career, while Alex is struggling with Reena's mother and Shekhar himself, who both feel that Reena and Alex might be too interested in each other. Bobby K. meanwhile, after a broken down car, gets stuck with Alisha in some abandoned hut at the beach, they have an opportunity to talk and make up, however shortly afterwards, a misunderstanding occurs and Alisha feels betrayed all over again. Reena, meanwhile, tells Alex to leave, as she is going to accept her family's wishes and will marry Shekhar in order to preserve the tradition of an arranged marriage. Alex is all ready to leave India and Bobby finds out that Shekhar is having an affair with a co-worker (The entire affair is caught on CD). Reena's parents tell her not give up her happiness and tell her to go after Alex, Bobby clarifies the misunderstanding between him and Alisha and makes her pursue her dreams and Reena stops Alex to leave the country after a rickshaw chase. Everything ends well and Reena and Alex, after professing their love for each other, get married.

Cast
 Jason Lewis as Alex Kincaid
 Kashmera Shah as Reena Khanna
 Gulshan Grover as Shekar Singh
 Sanjay Suri as Bobby
 Neha Dubey as Alisha
 Ash Chandler as Priyad
 Deepak Qazir as Reena's father
 Madhuri Bhatia as Reena's mother
 Sean O'Brien Teague as Sean "Shekhar"'s bodyguard
 Vineet Wadhwa as Ravi

Release 
Variety wrote that "That said, the film’s most marketable asset is, in a way, also its biggest liability".

References

External links
 

2006 films
Films about Indian Americans
2000s English-language films
2000s Hindi-language films
English-language Indian films
Films about interracial romance
Films scored by Anu Malik
American romance films
2000s American films
Asian-American romance films